Ecuador at the 1924 Summer Olympics in Paris, France was the first appearance of the nation's at the seventh edition of the 1924 Summer Olympics. An all-male national team of three athletes represented the nation at the 1924 Summer Olympics in four events all in athletics.

Athletics

Three athletes represented Ecuador in 1924. It was the nation's debut appearance in the sport as well as the Games./

Ranks given are within the heat.

References
Ecuador Olympic Committee
Official Olympic Reports
sports-reference

Nations at the 1924 Summer Olympics
1924
Olympics